Jordi de Manuel i Barrabín (Barcelona, 1962) teaches Natural Sciences and is also a writer who combines literature with teaching and research. He is a member of the SCCFF (Catalan Society of Fantasy and Science Fiction).

He has published stories and novels for children and adolescents, among them, El pes de la por (The Weight of Fear, 1998, with Sílvia Vega), El somni de la nena bruna (The Brown Girl’s Dream), which was awarded the City of Eivissa Prize for Children’s Literature in 2000, De tots colors (Of All Colours, 2001), Els ulls d’Abdeslam (Abdeslam’s Eyes, 2001), Set de llops (Seven Wolf Stories, 2003), and El beuratge (The Potion, 2003).

He has also written novels and stories for adults, including Tres somnis blaus (Three Blue Dreams), which received the 2000 Valldaura Prize, Cels taronges (Orange Skies) which was awarded the Ciutat de Mollerussa Prize in 2001, Cabells porpres (Purple Hair), winner of the 2002 Pere Calders Prize for Catalan Literature, Pantera negra (Black Panther), winner of the 2004 Sant Just Desvern Fiction Prize for Prose under the pseudonym Joan Gols, and Calcs (Borrowings), winner of the 2005 Manuel de Pedrolo Science Fiction Prize. His collection of stories entitled Disseccions (Dissections, 2001), was awarded the Odissea Readers’ Prize, the only literary award with a jury consisting of one hundred readers.

He has also published a number of research articles on biology, along with numerous papers on innovation and teaching in the Natural Sciences. He has participated in teams that have been awarded, for their contributions to Science teaching, the 1992 Barcanova Prize for Innovation in Teaching, the 1996 Enciclopèdia Catalana Prize for Research and Innovation in Teaching and the 1998 Eudald Maideu Prize. He is a member of AELC (Association of Catalan Language Writers).

Published works

Tales and novels for to children and teenagers
 El somni de la nena bruna. Premi Ciutat d'Eivissa, Res Publica, 2000
 De tots colors. Alfaguara, 2001
 Set de llops. La Galera, 2003
 El pes de la por. Alfaguara, 1998
 Un niu de formigues. Animallibres, 2008
 El beuratge. Alfaguara, 2003
 Els ulls d'Abdelslam. La Galera, 2001 (also traduced to Spanish)
Un niu de formigues. Animallibres, 2008
El món fosc. Talps. Santillana/Jollibre, 2018

Novels and short narrative for adults 
 Tres somnis blaus. Columna; premi Valldaura, 2000
 Cels taronges. Columna; premi Ciutat de Mollerussa, 2001
 Disseccions. Proa; premi El lector de L'Odissea, 2001
 Cabells propres. Columna; premi Pere Calders de Literatura Catalana, 2002
 L'olor de la pluja. La Magrana, 2006
 Calcs. Mataró. Ajuntament de Mataró, 2005
 El cant de les dunes. Pagès editors, 2006
 El raptor de gnoms. La Magrana, 2007
 Mans lliures. Edicions 62, 2009
 Orsai, Editorial Meteora, 2012
La mort del corredor de fons. Edicions 62, 2012.
La decisió de Manperel. Columna, 2013. Premi Pin i Soler de narrativa, 2013.
Científics lletraferits(con Salvador Macip), Ed. Mètode, 2013.
100 situacions extraordinàries a l'aula. Ed. Cossetània, 2014.
Foc verd. Ed. Alrevés. 2016
Mans negres. Pagès Editors. 2017

Short stories in anthologies 
 L'home que estripava llibres, a Un cop de Sort. Proa, 2003
 Dos anys de vacances, Al recull "Els fills del capità Verne". Lleida, Pagès editors, 2005
 El laberint, a Salou 6 pre-textos III. Barcelona, Meteora, 2007
 Segrest exprés, en Crims.cat, Alrevés, 2010.
 Nit del segon origen, en Tombes i lletres, Ed. Sidilla, 2010.
 Crònica breu d'un ésser estàtic, en Científics lletraferits, Ed. Mètode, 2013.
Els hostes, en Contes de terror, Lleida. Apostroph, 2017.
La trampa, en Viatge a la perifèria criminal, Barcelona, Alrevés, 2017

External links 
 Personal web
 Corpus literari Ciutat de Barcelona
 Qui és qui a les lletres catalanes
 AELC, autors

Catalan-language writers
Living people
Year of birth missing (living people)